This is a list of notable Americans of English descent, including both original immigrants who obtained American citizenship and their American descendants.

To be included in this list, the person must have a Wikipedia article showing they are English American or must have references showing they are English American and are notable.

List

Visual artists

Earl W. Bascom – "Cowboy of Cowboy Artists"
George Biddle
Edward Leigh Chase
Frank Swift Chase
Marissa Yardley Clifford
Arthur Crooks
Joseph DeCamp
Thomas Dewing
Thomas Eakins
Peter Harrison
Childe Hassam
Winslow Homer
Thomas Hope
Willard Metcalf
Grandma Moses
William Nichols
Frederic Remington – "Father of Cowboy Sculpture"
Norman Rockwell
John Singer Sargent
Thomas Sully
Edmund C. Tarbell
Abbott Handerson Thayer
John Trumbull
Calvert Vaux
Andrew Wyeth
N.C. Wyeth

Assassins, outlaws, and criminals
Clyde Barrow
John Wilkes Booth – Abraham Lincoln assassin
Lizzie Borden – central figure in the hatchet murders of her father and stepmother on August 4, 1892 in Fall River, Massachusetts
Calamity Jane – outlaw, whose real name was Martha Jane Cannary
Butch Cassidy – train and bank robber
Albert Fish – famed child serial killer
Charles J. Guiteau – James Garfield assassin
Jesse James – train and bank robber
Richard Lawrence – intellectually disabled criminal, who attempted to kill Andrew Jackson
Sophie Lyons
Lee Harvey Oswald – John F. Kennedy assassin
Bonnie Parker
William Poole – gangster, "Bill the Butcher", Know-Nothing politician
Arthur Shawcross
Belle Starr – notorious American outlaw

Astronauts
John Glenn
Christa McAuliffe – Irish, Lebanese, German, English, and Native American ancestry
Alan Shepard – first American to travel into space

Astronomers
Harold D. Babcock
Alvan Clark
Edgar Frisby 
Cecilia Payne-Gaposchkin
Asaph Hall
Henrietta Swan Leavitt
Percival Lowell
Carolyn S. Shoemaker
Clyde Tombaugh

Directors, producers
Robert Aldrich
Robert Altman
Tex Avery
John Badham
J. Stuart Blackton
Charles Brabin
George Howells Broadhurst
Nick Castle
Clint Eastwood
Howard Hawks
Fraser Clarke Heston
Jack Hope
David Horsley
Ron Howard
John Huston
Spike Jonze
George Lucas
Garry Marshall
Christopher Nolan
Jonathan Nolan
Hassard Short
Emma Thomas
Orson Welles
William A. Wellman

Descendants of Mayflower passengers
Alec Baldwin
Jordana Brewster –  actress
Chevy Chase –  Emmy Award-winning comedian, writer, and television and film actor
Johnny Carson 
Leslie Carter
Aaron Carter –  singer 
Nick Carter 
Bing Crosby –  actor and singer; father was a descendant
Clint Eastwood –  actor
Nick Folk –  football player
Jodie Foster –  actress
Richard Gere –  actor
Martha Graham –  dancer
Ulysses S. Grant –  Union Army general; US President
Linda Hamilton – actress
Hugh Hefner –  founder, majority owner, editor-in-chief, and Chief Creative Officer of Playboy Enterprises 
Katharine Hepburn –  iconic American actress of film, television and stage
Ashley Judd –  actress
Victoria Justice – actress, father of partial English descent
John Lithgow –  actor
Christopher Lloyd –  actor 
Henry Wadsworth Longfellow –  poet
Seth MacFarlane –  creator of Family Guy, Scottish, Welsh and English Ancestry
George B. McClellan –  Union Army general
Marilyn Monroe –  actress 
Anthony Perkins –  actor
Anne Ramsey – actress
Christopher Reeve –  actor 
Bill Richardson –  Governor of New Mexico (although he is 3/4 Latino)
Franklin D. Roosevelt –  U.S. President (although he was 1/4 Dutch)
Anna Mary Robertson Moses
Victoria Rowell –  actress
Sissy Spacek –  actress
Benjamin Spock –  pediatrician and author, Baby and Child Care
Dick Van Dyke –  
Noah Webster –  American lexicographer, textbook author, spelling reformer, political writer, word enthusiast, and editor

Entertainment

Actors

A
Candice Accola –  of partial English descent
Jensen Ackles – of partial English descent
Amy Adams – of partial English descent
Ben Affleck – of partial English descent
Casey Affleck – of partial English descent
Jessica Alba – mother of partial English descent
Karen Allen –  of partial English descent
Krista Allen – of partial English descent
Lauren Ambrose – mother of partial English descent
Gillian Anderson – of partial English descent
Jennifer Aniston – mother of partial English descent
Hayley Atwell
Jean Arthur
Jake T. Austin –  father of English descent

B
Kevin Bacon – of partial English descent
Brandon Baker – of partial English descent
Christian Bale
Alec Baldwin – of partial English descent
Daniel Baldwin – of partial English descent
Stephen Baldwin – of partial English descent
William Baldwin – of partial English descent
Mark Ballas – mother of partial English descent
Fred Ball – mother of partial English descent
Lucille Ball – of partial English descent
Jamie Bamber
Elizabeth Banks – of partial English descent
Cooper Barnes (born April 15, 1979) – born in England, immigrated to USA
Sasha Barrese – of partial English descent
Ethel Barrymore – of partial English descent
Drew Barrymore – father of partial English descent
Maurice Barrymore – of partial English descent
Mischa Barton – father of English descent
Earl W. Bascom – paternal grandmother born in England
Jason Bateman – mother born in England; father of part English descent
Emily Beecham
Lake Bell – mother of part English descent
Laura Joyce Bell – London-born singer and actress; wife of the American comedian Digby Bell
Tobin Bell – mother was English
Troian Bellisario – mother of English descent
Joan Bennett – grandfather of half English descent
Barbara Bennett – grandfather of half English descent
Constance Bennett – grandfather of half English descent
Emily Bergl – father of English descent
Kelli Berglund – of partial English descent
Halle Berry – mother of part English descent
Valerie Bertinelli – mother of English descent
Jessica Biel – of partial English descent
Jason Biggs – father of half English descent
Bill Bixby – both parents of English descent
Jack Black –  father of partial English descent
Tyler Blackburn
JB Blanc – actor, mother of English descent
Rowan Blanchard – mother of English descent
Cate Blanchett
Alexis Bledel – of partial English descent
Violetta Blue
Emily Blunt
Humphrey Bogart – father of partial English descent; mother mainly of English descent
Matt Bomer – of partial English descent
Powers Boothe – of partial English descent
Julie Bowen – of partial English descent
Lucy Boynton
Elizabeth Bracco – mother was English
Lorraine Bracco – mother was English
Zach Braff –  mother of partial English descent
Vanessa Branch
Marlon Brando – both parents of partial English descent
Benjamin Bratt – father of part English descent
Amy Brenneman – father of partial English descent
Jordana Brewster – father of part English descent, descendant of Mayflower passengers
Dorothy Bridges – father was English
Richard Bright
James Broderick – one quarter English descent
Matthew Broderick – father of one quarter English descent
James Brolin – of partial English descent
Josh Brolin – of partial English descent
Louise Brooks
Clancy Brown – actor of English, Scottish, Irish, German, Welsh, and Dutch descent. Best known as the voice of Mr. Krabs on SpongeBob SquarePants.
Sandra Bullock – father of partial English descent
Ty Burrell – of partial English descent
Steve Burton
Sophia Bush – of partial English descent

C
John Carradine – of partial English descent
Keith Carradine – of partial English descent
Robert Carradine – of partial English descent
Lynda Carter – father of half English descent
 Dana Carvey – American comedian, actor and producer, small amount of English ancestry.
Katie Cassidy – of partial English descent
Mary Castle
Matt Cedeño – mother of half English descent
Lacey Chabert – both parents of partial English descent
Lon Chaney Sr. – father mostly of English descent
Lon Chaney Jr. – of partial English descent
Charles Chaplin Jr.
Geraldine Chaplin – father of English descent
Josephine Chaplin – father of English descent
Kiera Chaplin – father of English descent
Michael Chaplin – father of English descent
Sydney Earle Chaplin – father of English descent
Victoria Chaplin – father of English descent
Ruth Chatterton – father of English descent
Chevy Chase – both parents of mainly English descent
Kelsey Chow – mother of English descent
John Clarke
Melinda Clarke – father of English descent
Montgomery Clift – mainly of English descent
Kristen Cloke – of partial English descent
George Clooney – of partial English descent
Glenn Close  – of mostly English descent
Lauren Cohan – lived in New Jersey before moving to the United Kingdom with her mother
Stephen Colbert – small amount of English ancestry
Jack Coleman
Lily Collins – father of English descent; maternal grandmother of mainly English descent
Constance Collier – both parents of English descent
Gary Cooper – both parents of English descent
James Corden – London-born comedian, actor, singer, and television personality; host of The Late Late Show with James Corden
Miranda Cosgrove – of partial English descent
Kevin Costner – of partial English descent
D.J. Cotrona – small amount of English descent 
Courteney Cox – both parents mainly of English descent
Edward Coxen – both parents of English descent
Jeanne Crain – father of English descent
James Cromwell
Bing Crosby – father of English descent, and a descendant of Mayflower passengers
David Cross – father English-born
Marcia Cross
Tom Cruise – father of partial English descent
Jon Cryer
Cameron Cuffe 
Macaulay Culkin – father of partial English descent
Tim Curry – English-born actor, most notable for portrayal of Dr. Frank-N-Furter in The Rocky Horror Picture Show and its remake
Jamie Lee Curtis – maternal grandfather of partial English descent

D
Alexandra Daddario – of partial English descent
Willem Dafoe – of partial English descent
Nicholas D'Agosto – mother of partial English descent
Ian Anthony Dale – of partial English descent
Matt Damon – father of partial English descent
Dorothy Dandridge – father of partial English descent
Claire Danes – of partial English descent
Blythe Danner – of partial English descent
Ted Danson – of partial English descent
Fanny Davenport – both parents of English descent
Harry Davenport
Bette Davis – both parents of mainly English descent
Jaye Davidson – mother of English descent
Sarah Lynn Dawson
James Dean
Ellen DeGeneres – of partial English descent
Dana Delaney – of half English descent
Robert De Niro – mother of partial English descent
Joe DeRita – of half English descent
Johnny Depp – of partial English descent
Rebecca De Mornay – paternal grandfather was English 
Laura Dern – of partial English descent
Emily Deschanel – of partial English descent
Zooey Deschanel – of partial English descent
Jenna Dewan –  mother of partial English descent
Cameron Diaz – mother of partial English descent
Vin Diesel – mother (and possibly father) of partial English descent
Peter Dinklage – of partial English descent
Shannen Doherty – mother of partial English descent
Taylor Dooley – of partial English descent
Melvyn Douglas – mother of English descent
Michael Douglas – mother of partial English descent
Lesley-Anne Down
Robin Atkin Downes
Minnie Driver
Haylie Duff – of partial English descent
Hilary Duff – of partial English descent
Josh Duhamel – of partial English descent
Clark Duke – of partial English descent
Faye Dunaway – of partial English descent
Eliza Dushku – mother of part English descent
Deanna Durbin – both parents of English descent
Robert Duvall – of partial English descent

E
Leslie Easterbrook – of partial English descent
Alison Eastwood – of partial English descent
Clint Eastwood – of partial English descent
Kyle Eastwood – of partial English descent
Scott Eastwood – of partial English descent
Aaron Eckhart – mother of partial English descent
Anthony Edwards – of partial English descent
Jennifer Ehle – of partial English descent
Carmen Electra – of partial English descent
Ansel Elgort – maternal grandfather of partial English descent
Shannon Elizabeth – mother of partial English descent
June Elvidge – of half English descent
Dick Enberg – mother of partial English descent
Edith Evanson
Alice Eve

F
Edie Falco – mother of partial English descent
Dakota Fanning – of partial English descent
Elle Fanning – of partial English descent
Farrah Fawcett – both parents of mainly English descent
Will Ferrell – of mainly English descent
Tina Fey – father of partial English descent
W.C. Fields – father born in England
Jenna Fischer
Carrie Fisher – mother of partial English descent
Charles Fisher
Frances Fisher – father of English descent
Sean Patrick Flanery – of partial English descent
James Flavin
Jonathan Frakes – of partial English descent
Pauline Frederick – father of half English descent
Scott Foley – of partial English descent
Bridget Fonda – of partial English descent
Jane Fonda – of partial English descent
Peter Fonda – of partial English descent
Joan Fontaine – both parents of English descent
Glenn Ford
Trent Ford
Wallace Ford – both parents of English descent
Robert Forster – father of part English descent
Matthew Fox – both parents of part English descent
Megan Fox – both parents of mainly English descent
Michael J. Fox – of partial English descent
Jeff Foxworthy
Drew Fuller – of partial English descent

G
Robert Gant – of partial English descent
Ava Gardner – mainly of English descent
Andrew Garfield – was raised in England; mother is English-born 
Judy Garland – of partial English descent
Jennifer Garner
Greer Garson
Gladys George
Richard Gere
Leila George
Malcolm Gets
Paul Giamatti – of partial English descent
Carmine Giovinazzo – of partial English descent
Crispin Glover – father of partial English descent
Paulette Goddard – mother of English descent
John Goodman – of partial English descent
Ginnifer Goodwin – father of English descent
Gale Gordon – mother of English descent
Burn Gorman – both parents are English 
Milena Govich – mother of half English descent
Lucas Grabeel – of part English descent
Betty Grable – of partial English descent
Lauren Graham – mother of part English descent
Cary Grant – English-born, became an American citizen
Christopher Guest – father of partial English descent
Carla Gugino – mother of partial English descent
Mamie Gummer – mother of partial English descent
Ryan Guzman – mother of partial English descent
Jake Gyllenhaal – father of part English descent
Maggie Gyllenhaal – father of part English descent

H
Gene Hackman – of partial English descent
Bill Hader – of partial English descent
Kathryn Hahn – of partial English descent
Angelica Hale – English father 
Rebecca Hall – English father
Jon Hamm – of partial English descent
Armie Hammer – of partial English descent
Woody Harrelson – of partial English descent
Mariska Hargitay – mother of half English descent
Justin Hartley
David Hasselhoff – mother of English descent; father of partial English descent
Anne Hathaway – father of partial English descent
Rondo Hatton
Olivia de Havilland – both parents of English descent
Jonah Hauer-King – English father
Goldie Hawn – father of partial English descent
Colton Haynes – of mainly English descent 
Tricia Helfer
Florence Henderson 
Logan Henderson – of partial English descent
Christina Hendricks – father English-born; mother of partial English descent
David Henrie – father of half English descent
Katharine Hepburn – of mostly English descent, descendant of Mayflower
Charlton Heston – of part English descent
Jennifer Love Hewitt – of heavily English descent
Catherine Hicks – of half English descent
Paris Hilton – of partial English descent
Tyler Hoechlin – mother of partial English descent
Philip Seymour Hoffman – of partial English descent
William Holden – both parents of mainly English descent
Katie Holmes – of partial English descent
Bob Hope – English born and immigrated to the US in 1908
Hopsin – partial English descent
John Houseman – mother of part English descent
Bryce Dallas Howard – of part English descent
Kelly Hu – of partial English descent
Kate Hudson – of partial English descent
Oliver Hudson – of partial English descent
Rock Hudson – mother of partial English descent
Felicity Huffman – of partial English descent
Helen Hunt – of partial English descent
Anjelica Huston – father of partial English descent
Danny Huston – of partial English descent
John Huston
Josh Hutcherson

I-J
Jonathan Jackson – of partial English descent
Celina Jade
Caitlyn Jenner
Kendall Jenner – of partial English descent
Kris Jenner
Kylie Jenner – of partial English descent
Boris Johnson – born and lived in New York City before moving to the United Kingdom
Kristen Johnston
January Jones – of partial English descent
Tommy Lee Jones – of partial English descent
Victoria Justice – father of partial English descent

K
Matthew Kane
Khloé Kardashian – mother of mainly English descent
Kim Kardashian – mother of mainly English descent 
Kourtney Kardashian – mother of mainly English descent 
Rob Kardashian – mother of mainly English descent 
Zoe Kazan – of partial English descent
Stacy Keach – father of English descent
Stacy Keach Sr.
Diane Keaton – mother of partial English descent
Michael Keaton – father of partial English descent
Ellie Kemper – of partial English descent
Anna Kendrick – of partial English descent
George Kennedy – of partial English descent
Tom Kenny – of partial English descent
John Kerr
Nicole Kidman – both parents of mainly English descent
Val Kilmer – father of partial English descent
Justin Kirk – father of partial English descent
Jen Kirkman –  of partial English descent
Hayley Kiyoko – father of half English descent
Chris Klein – small amount of English descent 
Wayne Knight – father of English descent
David Koechner – of partial English descent

L

Alan Ladd
Alan Ladd Jr. – of partial English descent
David Ladd – of partial English descent
Diane Ladd – of partial English descent
Jordan Ladd – of partial English descent
Sanoe Lake – of partial English descent
Burt Lancaster – all grandparents of English descent
Lillie Langtry
Angela Lansbury – father of English descent
Taylor Lautner – of partial English descent
Jennifer Lawrence – of partial English descent
Brandon Lee – mother of half English descent
Kodi Lee – of partial English descent
Jane Leeves
Janet Leigh – father of partial English descent
Téa Leoni – both parents of partial English descent
David Letterman – father of partial English descent
Jared Leto – biological father of partial English descent
Sam Lloyd
June Lockhart
Demi Lovato – mother of English descent
Chad Lowe – of partial English descent
Rob Lowe – of partial English descent
Camilla Luddington
Lorna Luft – mother of partial English descent
Kellan Lutz – small amount of English ancestry

M

Seth MacFarlane – of partial English descent
Kyle MacLachlan – of partial English descent
Meredith MacRae – mother English born
William H. Macy
Michael Madsen – mother of partial English descent
Virginia Madsen – mother of partial English descent
Roma Maffia – of partial English descent
Tobey Maguire – of partial English descent
Tina Majorino – mother of half English descent
Wendie Malick – of partial English descent
John Malkovich – mother of partial English descent
Jayne Mansfield – of 3/4 English descent
William Mapother – of partial English descent
Meghan Markle – of partial English descent
James Marsden – of partial English descent
Lee Marvin
Matthew McConaughey – of partial English descent
Jennette McCurdy – of partial English descent
Dylan McDermott – mother of half English descent
Benjamin McKenzie – of partial English descent
Wendi McLendon-Covey
Steve McQueen – of partial English descent
Burgess Meredith – father of English descent
Jesse Metcalfe – father of partial English descent
Sienna Miller
Wentworth Miller – father of partial English descent, himself born
Liza Minnelli – mother of partial English descent
Demi Moore – father is English
Mary Tyler Moore – of partial English descent
Agnes Moorehead
Elizabeth Montgomery – both parents of mainly English descent 
Frank Morgan
Ralph Morgan
Viggo Mortensen – mother of English descent
Tamera Mowry – father of English descent
Tia Mowry – father of English descent
Meg Mundy
Olivia Munn – father of partial English descent
Edward R. Murrow – of partial English descent

N-O

Bob Newhart – father of partial English descent 
Becki Newton
Matt Newton
Michelle Nicastro – mother of partial English descent
Thomas Ian Nicholas – of partial English descent
Jack Nicholson – mother of part English descent
Lorraine Nicholson – father of English descent
Chuck Norris – of mainly English descent 
Edward Norton
Dylan O'Brien – mother of 1/4 English descent
John Oliver
Elizabeth Olsen – mother of English descent
Mary-Kate and Ashley Olsen – mother of English descent  
Timothy Olyphant – of partial English descent
Ryan O'Neal – father of partial English descent
Tatum O'Neal – of partial English descent
Heather O'Rourke (1975-1988) – of partial English descent; best known for her lead role in the Poltergeist film series
Emily Osment – of partial English descent
Haley Joel Osment – of partial English descent
Chord Overstreet – of partial English descent
David Oyelowo
Jessica Oyelowo

P-Q
Adrianne Palicki – mother of partial English descent 
Gwyneth Paltrow – mother of partial English descent
Eleanor Parker – both parents were of part English descent
Mary-Louise Parker – of partial English descent
Sarah Jessica Parker – mother of part English descent
Audrina Patridge – of partial English descent
Aaron Paul – of mostly English descent
Al Pearce
Gregory Peck – both parents were of part English descent
Mizuo Peck – father of partial English descent
Nicola Peltz –  of partial English descent
William Peltz – of partial English descent
Nia Peeples – of partial English descent
Chelsea Peretti – father of half English descent
Matthew Perry – of partial English descent
Ryan Phillippe – of partial English descent
Joaquin Phoenix – father of mainly English descent 
River Phoenix – father of mainly English descent 
Mary Pickford – father of English descent
Christina Pickles – both parents of English descent
Justin Pierce – father of English descent
Chris Pine – of partial English descent
Brad Pitt – of heavily English descent
Aubrey Plaza – mother of part English descent
Martha Plimpton – of partial English descent
Amy Poehler – of partial English descent
Ellen Pompeo – father of partial English descent
Tyler Posey – father of partial English descent
Tyrone Power – father of partial English descent
Chris Pratt – father of partial English descent
Laura Prepon – mother of partial English descent
Victoria Principal – mother of English descent
Freddie Prinze Jr. – mother of partial English descent
Bill Pullman – father of partial English descent
Dennis Quaid – of partial English descent
Randy Quaid – of partial English descent

R
Adam Rayner
Robert Redford – of paternal English descent, English grandmother
Tara Reid – of partial English descent
Tracy Reiner
James Remar – mother was English
Jeremy Renner – of partial English descent
Giovanni Ribisi – of partial English descent
Denise Richards – of partial English descent
Michael Richards – father had English ancestry
Blanche Ring – great-great-grandfather of English descent
Molly Ringwald – of partial English descent
Jason Ritter – of partial English descent
John Ritter – of partial English descent
Lee Remick – of partial English descent
Burt Reynolds – of partial English descent
Debbie Reynolds – of partial English descent
Jason Robards – of partial English descent
AnnaSophia Robb – of partial English descent
Emma Roberts – of partial English descent
Eric Roberts – both parents  of partial English descent
Julia Roberts – both parents of partial English descent
James Roday – mother of partial English descent
Sarah Roemer – of partial English descent
Rebecca Romijn – mother of half English descent
Neil Ross – London-born voice actor
Brandon Routh – of partial English descent
Paul Rudd – both parents English Jews
Rene Russo – mother of partial English descent
Amy Ryan – of partial English descent
Remy Ryan – of partial English descent

S

Mark Salling – of partial English descent
Susan Sarandon – father of partial English descent
Peter Sarsgaard – of partial English descent
Seann William Scott – of partial English descent
Edie Sedgwick
Kyra Sedgwick – father of English descent
Robert Sedgwick – father of English descent
Michael Shannon
Marian Seldes – mother of English descent
Tom Selleck 
Amanda Seyfried – of partial English descent
Sara Shane – of partial English descent
Nicollette Sheridan
Brooke Shields – both parents of partial English descent
Andrew Shue – of partial English descent
Elisabeth Shue – of partial English descent
Casey Siemaszko – mother of English descent
Nina Siemaszko – mother of English descent
Molly Sims – father of English descent
Guy Siner – mother of English descent
Alicia Silverstone – father an English Jew
Douglas Smith – father English-born; mother of partial English descent
Gregory Smith – father English-born; mother of partial English descent
Jaclyn Smith – mother of mainly English descent
Kerr Smith – of partial English descent
Ian Somerhalder – of partial English descent
Kevin Sorbo – mother of partial English descent
Shannyn Sossamon – of partial English descent
James Spader – of partial English descent
Britney Spears – of part English descent
Jamie Lynn Spears – of part English descent
John Stamos – mother of part English descent
Kim Stanley – mother of half English descent
Karen Steele – father of English descent
Mary Steenburgen – of partial English descent
Julia Stiles – mother of part English descent
Emma Stone – of partial English descent
Sharon Stone – of partial English descent
Madeleine Stowe – father of partial English descent
Beatrice Straight
Steven Strait – of half English descent
Meryl Streep – mother of part English descent
Gregg Sulkin
Patrick Swayze – of partial English descent

T
William Talman – grandparents of English descent
Jessica Tandy – both parents of English descent
Channing Tatum – of partial English descent
Miles Teller – of partial English descent
Shirley Temple – part English. 
Uma Thurman – father of partial English descent
Spencer Tracy – mother of English descent
Greg Travis
Stacey Travis
Elizabeth Taylor – both parents of mainly English descent
Callie Thorne – of partial English descent 
Courtney Thorne-Smith
Gene Tierney – mother of mainly English descent
 Justin Timberlake
Jonathan Tucker – father of half English descent
Alan Tudyk – mother of part English descent
Sonny Tufts
Lana Turner
Liv Tyler – both parents of partial English descent

U-V
Tracey Ullman –  mother of English descent
Erik Valdez – mother of English and Irish descent
Casper Van Dien – of partial English descent
Dick Van Dyke –  mother of half English descent
Jerry Van Dyke – mother of half English descent
Vince Vaughn – both parents of partial English descent
Milo Ventimiglia –  mother of partial English descent

W-Z
Natasha Gregson Wagner –  father English-born
Donnie Wahlberg – mother of part English descent
Mark Wahlberg –  mother of part English descent
Robert Wahlberg – mother of part English descent
Paul Walker – of mainly English descent
Robert Walker – of half English descent
Evelyn Ward 
Mateus Ward - father of partial English descent
Kerry Washington – mother of partial English descent
Sam Waterston – mother  of English descent, a descendant of Mayflower passengers
John Wayne 
Dennis Weaver – father of partial English descent
Sigourney Weaver – mother of English descent; father of mainly English descent
Sylvester Weaver
Justin Welborn
Raquel Welch – mother of English descent
Tom Welling
Betty White – both parents of partial English descent
Kristen Wiig – of part English descent
Olivia Wilde – father of mainly English descent and mother has partial English descent
Adrienne Wilkinson – of partial English descent
Barry Williams – of partial English descent
Michelle Williams – of partial English descent
Robin Williams – of partial English descent
Zelda Williams – father of partially English descent
Bruce Willis – father of partially English descent
Patrick Wilson – father of English descent
Rainn Wilson
Philip Winchester –  mother English-born
Mary Elizabeth Winstead – Parents are both English
Jonathan Winters – of part English descent
Elijah Wood – father of half English descent
Shailene Woodley – of partial English descent
James Woods – father of English descent
Fay Wray – father of English descent
Jane Wyatt  – of partial English descent
John Lloyd Young –  father of part English descent

Authors and writers
Louisa May Alcott
Thomas Bailey Aldrich
Kevin Andrews
Natalie Barney
Amelia Edith Huddleston Barr
John Bartlett
L. Frank Baum
Ambrose Bierce
Tony Blankley
Victor Bockris
William Cullen Bryant
Christopher Buckley
William F. Buckley Jr.
Edgar Rice Burroughs
William S. Burroughs
Carolyn Cassady
Raymond Chandler
 J. Smeaton Chase
Winston Churchill (novelist)
Chris Claremont
Florence Earle Coates 
James Fenimore Cooper
Stephen Crane
Ann Coulter
Coningsby Dawson
John Derbyshire
Emily Dickinson
Ralph Waldo Emerson
William Faulkner
Diana Gabaldon
Joseph Gales
Hamlin Garland
Zane Grey
Edgar Guest
Dashiell Hammett
Nathaniel Hawthorne
Bret Harte
Ernest Hemingway
O. Henry
Thomas S. Hinde
Christopher Hitchens
Oliver Wendell Holmes Sr.
Washington Irving
Henry James
Sarah Orne Jewett
Agnes Newton Keith
Helen Keller
Stephen King
Nicole Krauss
Sidney Lanier
Ring Lardner
Estelle Anna Lewis 
Jack London
Henry Wadsworth Longfellow
H. P. Lovecraft
Robert Lowell
Herman Melville –  descendant of Percival Lowle
William Least Heat-Moon
Mary O'Hara
Thomas Paine
Thomas Nelson Page
Edgar Allan Poe
William Henry Leonard Poe
Katherine Anne Porter
Thomas Pynchon
James Wesley Rawles
E. E. Smith
Nicholas Sparks
Lynne Spears
Benjamin Spock
John Steinbeck
Charles Warren Stoddard
Harriet Beecher Stowe
Glendon Swarthout
Anthony Swofford
Henry David Thoreau
Mark Twain
Gore Vidal
Lew Wallace
Robert Penn Warren
Noah Webster
Eudora Welty
Walt Whitman
Laura Ingalls Wilder
Tennessee Williams
Michael Z. Williamson
Jason F. Wright

Musicians
Alex Gaskarth – lead vocalist of All Time Low (born in Essex)
Dimebag Darrell Abbott – former lead guitarist of Pantera
Vinnie Paul Abbott – former Pantera drummer
Trace Adkins
Christina Aguilera –   mother of partial English descent
Kevin Rudolf – father of English descent
Clay Aiken
Elijah Blue Allman
  Jimmy The Rev Sullivan –   former drummer for American Metal Band Avenged Sevenfold
Billie Joe Armstrong – founder of Green Day
Joan Baez
Mark Ballas –  mother is English 
Baby Bash
Josh Beech
Owen Biddle
Rebecca Black –  of partial English descent
Jack Brooks – lyricist
Rex Brown – former Pantera bassist
Jeff Buckley –  father of partial English descent
Cliff Burton–father is mostly of English descent 
John Cage – composer; of English and Scottish descent
Jerry Cantrell
Aaron Carter
Leslie Carter
Nick Carter
Johnny Cash
Cher – mother of partial English descent
Kelly Clarkson – both parents of partial English descent
Kurt Cobain
David Cook
Alice Cooper
Billy Corgan 
Billy Ray Cyrus
Miley Cyrus
Glenn Danzig 
Jamie Davis
Spencer Dryden –   longest-serving drummer for Jefferson Airplane; nephew of Charlie Chaplin
Eminem – of mostly English descent
Sara Evans
John Fogerty
Brandon Flowers –  lead singer of The Killers
Black Francis – is the singer and rhythm guitarist of the Pixies.
Yung Gravy
Paul Gray – Slipknot bassist
Kirk Hammett
Albert Hammond Jr – father is of English descent
Jack Harlow
James Hetfield – singer/rhythm guitarist of Metallica
Buddy Holly – of mostly English descent
Josh Homme 
Burl Ives
Waylon Jennings
Norah Jones –  mother of English descent
Janis Joplin
Joey Jordison – Slipknot drummer
JoJo
Naomi Judd
Wynonna Judd
Dana Key –  Christian rock guitarist; direct descendant of Francis Scott Key
Alicia Keys –  mother of partial English descent
Anthony Kiedis
Alison Krauss
Kris Kristofferson
Amy Lee
Kodi Lee
Greg London
Courtney Love
Mike Love
Lene Lovich –  mother of English descent
Tony Lucca
Ludacris –  of partial English descen
Post Malone
Mike Mccre
Reba McEntire
Tim McGraw
Charles Mingus –  mother of partial English descent
Moby
Mandy Moore –  maternal grandmother of English descent; father of partial English descent
Thurston Moore –  is best known as a member of Sonic Youth.
Jim Morrison
Dave Mustaine
Ricky Nelson
Willie Nelson – of mostly English descent
Michael Nesmith
Joanna Newsom
Jason Newsted
Wayne Newton
Stevie Nicks
Justin Nozuka –  mother of English descent
The Osmonds
Randy Owen
Jennifer Paige
Sara Paxton
Katy Perry – father of English descent; mother of partial English descent
Tom Petty – of mostly English descent
John Phillips – was leader and a member of the vocal group The Mamas & the Papas.
Michelle Phillips
Elvis Presley
Iggy Pop
Romina Power
Trent Reznor – is the lead vocalist, multi-instrumentalist, and songwriter of  band Nine Inch Nails
Tony Rice
Kevin Richardson
James Root – guitarist
Tommy Shaw
Blake Shelton
Ashlee Simpson – both parents of mostly English descent
Jessica Simpson –  both parents of mostly English descent
Slash – rock guitarist
Isaac Slade – lead vocalist,main songwriter and pianist of The Fray
Grace Slick – singer and former model; her mother is a direct descendant of Mayflower passengers
Elliott Smith
Matt Sorum – drummer
Britney Spears –  maternal grandmother of English descent; father mostly of English descent
Jamie Lynn Spears – maternal grandmother of English descent; father mostly of English descent
Layne Staley
Izzy Stradlin – rock musician
Gene Summers
Taylor Swift –  both parents of partial English descent
Corey Taylor – singer Slipknot Stone Sour
Rob Thomas
Justin Timberlake – of mostly English descent
Randy Travis
Steven Tyler – mother of half English descent
Townes Van Zandt – of mostly English descent
Eddie Vedder
Tom Waits
Hank Williams
Brian Wilson
Sid Wilson – member of nu-metal band Slipknot
"Weird Al" Yankovic – singer and satirist; maternal grandmother of English descent
Trisha Yearwood
Adam Young

Entrepreneurs, executives
P. T. Barnum
Anthony Joseph Drexel Biddle Sr.
Nicholas Biddle
Benjamin C. Bradlee
Benjamin Brewster
Caleb Bradham – creator of Pepsi
John Browning – firearm innovator and founder of Browning Arms Company
Walter Chrysler – founder of the Chrysler Corporation
Henry Clews – financier
William R. Coe – insurance company, railroad, and business executive, and philanthropist
James Boorman Colgate – financier
Samuel Colgate – manufacturer
William Colgate – manufacturer who founded what became the Colgate toothpaste company
Charles Deering
Roy O. Disney
Walt Disney
John Francis Dodge – automobile manufacturing pioneer
William E. Dodge
Benjamin Newton Duke
James Buchanan Duke
Charles B. Finch
Bill Gates – co-founder of Microsoft and world's richest man for 13 years in a row
A. Bartlett Giamatti
Edward Henry Harriman – railroad executive
Charles T. Hayden
Joseph Lowthian Hudson
Samuel Insull – investor, known for purchasing utilities and railroads
Arthur Curtiss James
Oliver Burr Jennings
Will Keith Kellogg
Matthew Laflin
Edward Lamb 
Charles M. Loring
Rowland Hussey Macy –  founder of the R.H. Macy and Company
J. Willard Marriott –  founder of the Marriott International
J. P. Morgan – banker
Robert Noyce – co-founder of Intel
Ransom E. Olds – pioneer of the American automotive industry
Augustus G. Paine Jr.
Augustus G. Paine Sr.
Gloria Pall
Oliver Hazard Payne
Anson Greene Phelps –  descended from the early American colonial governors Thomas Dudley, John Haynes and George Wyllys
Madeleine Pickens
Charles Pratt
Henry Huttleston Rogers
Eugene Selvage 
Samuel Slater – early American industrialist popularly known as the "Founder of the American Industrial Revolution"
Harold Stanley – banker
Charles Lewis Tiffany
Harold Stirling Vanderbilt
Ellis Wainwright 
Sam Walton – founder of the American retailer Wal-Mart
Henry Wells – co-founder of the Wells Fargo & Company
Meg Whitman
Henry Melville Whitney
George Dennick Wick
Oliver Winchester – founder of Winchester Repating Arms Company

First Ladies of the United States
(in order by their husband's presidency)
Martha Washington
Abigail Smith Adams
Martha Jefferson
Dolley Madison
Elizabeth Monroe
Louisa Adams
Rachel Jackson
Anna Harrison
Letitia Tyler
Julia Tyler
Sarah Polk
Margaret Taylor
Abigail Fillmore
Mary Lincoln
Julia Grant
Lucy Hayes
Lucretia Garfield
Frances Cleveland
Caroline Harrison
Ida Saxton McKinley
Edith Roosevelt
Helen Taft
Ellen Wilson
Edith Wilson
Florence Harding
Grace Coolidge
Lou Hoover
Eleanor Roosevelt
Bess Truman
Mamie Eisenhower
Jackie Kennedy
Lady Bird Johnson
Betty Ford
Rosalynn Carter
Nancy Reagan
Barbara Bush
Hillary Clinton
Laura Bush

Governors of states
Greg Abbott –  Texas
Neil Abercrombie –  Hawaii
Samuel Adams –  Massachusetts
Homer Martin Adkins –  Arkansas
Nahum J. Bachelder –  New Hampshire
John J. Bagley –  Michigan
Charlie Baker –  Massachusetts 
James Barbour –  Virginia
Frederick Bates –  Missouri
Phil Batt –  Idaho
Gunning Bedford Sr. –  Delaware
Willie Blount –  Tennessee
William D. Bloxham –  Florida
Jan Brewer –  Arizona
Owen Brewster –  Maine
Paul Brigham –  Vermont
Bryant Butler Brooks Wyoming
John Brough –  Ohio
C. Douglass Buck –  Delaware
Morgan Bulkeley –  Connecticut
Jeb Bush –  Florida
Ezra Butler –  Vermont
Harry F. Byrd –  Virginia
Cyrus C. Carpenter –  Iowa
Michael Castle –  Delaware
John Chafee –  Rhode Island
Person Colby Cheney –  New Hampshire
Martin Chittenden –  Vermont
Thomas Chittenden –  Vermont
Joshua Clayton –  Delaware
Powell Clayton –  Arkansas
DeWitt Clinton –  New York
George Clinton –  New York
Howell Cobb –  Georgia
Thomas Collins –  Delaware
Alfred H. Colquitt –  Georgia
John Cook –  Delaware
Nicholas Cooke –  Rhode Island
Steve Cowper –  Alaska
Moody Currier –  New Hampshire
John Christopher Cutler –  Utah
Nathan Cutler –  Maine
Mitch Daniels –  Indiana
William Richardson Davie –  North Carolina
Howard Dean –  Vermont
Nelson Dewey –  Wisconsin
Nelson Dingley Jr. –  Maine
Edward H. East –  Tennessee
Walter Evans Edge –  New Jersey
Charles Edison –  New Jersey
Samuel Elbert –  Georgia
Buford Ellington –  Tennessee
Edward Everett –  Massachusetts
Hamilton Fish –  New York
John Brown Francis –  Rhode Island
Elbridge Gerry –  Massachusetts
Mills E. Godwin Jr. –  Virginia
Frank R. Gooding –  Idaho
Theodore F. Green –  Rhode Island
William Greene –  Rhode Island
Frederic T. Greenhalge –  Massachusetts
James W. Grimes –  Iowa
Matthew Griswold –  Connecticut
Button Gwinnett –  Georgia
Joshua Hall –  Maine
Lyman Hall –  Georgia
James Hamilton Jr. –  South Carolina
James Henry Hammond –  South Carolina
Jay Hammond –  Alaska
Wade Hampton III –  South Carolina
George Handley –  Georgia
Clifford Hansen –  Wyoming
Benjamin Harrison V –  Virginia
Joseph Roswell Hawley –  Connecticut
David Hazzard –  Delaware
Patrick Henry –  Virginia
John Hoeven –  North Dakota
Henry Hollis Horton –  Tennessee
John Eager Howard –  Maryland
Richard Howly –  Georgia
Mike Huckabee –  Arkansas
Samuel Huntington –  Connecticut
Jonathan G. Hunton –  Maine
James Iredell Jr. –  North Carolina
James Jackson –  Georgia
Thomas Johnson –  Maryland
William King – West Florida
Joseph Kent –  Maryland
Philip La Follette –  Wisconsin
Robert M. La Follette –  Wisconsin
John Langdon –  New Hampshire
Blair Lee III –  Maryland
Fitzhugh Lee –  Virginia
Henry Lee III –  Virginia
Thomas Sim Lee –  Maryland
Levi Lincoln Jr. –  Massachusetts
Lloyd Lowndes Jr. –  Maryland
George Madison –  Kentucky
Stevens T. Mason –  Michigan
Alexander McNutt –  Mississippi
Matt Mead –  Wyoming
William Dunn Moseley –  Florida
Abner Nash –  North Carolina
William A. Newell –  New Jersey
Wilson Cary Nicholas –  Virginia
Jay Nixon –  Missouri 
Donald Grant Nutter –  Montana
Aaron Ogden –  New Jersey
Charles Smith Olden –  New Jersey
John Eugene Osborne –  Wyoming
William Paca –  Maryland
John Page –  Virginia
Sarah Palin –  Alaska
William A. Palmer –  Vermont
Frederic Hale Parkhurst –  Maine
Albion Parris –  Maine
David Paterson –  New York
Endicott Peabody –  Massachusetts
William Sanford Pennington –  New Jersey
John S. Phelps –  Missouri
Sidney Perham –  Maine
Rick Perry –  Texas
Francis Wilkinson Pickens –  South Carolina
Benjamin Pierce –  New Hampshire
John S. Pillsbury –  Minnesota
Charles Pinckney –  South Carolina
William Plumer –  New Hampshire
Beverley Randolph –  Virginia
Edmund Randolph –  Virginia
Peyton Randolph –  Virginia
Thomas Mann Randolph Jr. –  Virginia
George Read –  Delaware
Bill Richardson –  New Mexico
Tom Ridge –  Pennsylvania
Charles Carnan Ridgely –  Maryland
Jim Risch –  Idaho
Wyndham Robertson –  Virginia
Caesar Rodney –  Delaware
Daniel Rogers –  Delaware
George W. Romney –  Michigan
Mitt Romney –  Massachusetts
William E. Russell –  Massachusetts
Edward Rutledge –  South Carolina
John Rutledge –  South Carolina
Leverett Saltonstall –  Massachusetts
Francis W. Sargent –  Massachusetts
William Scranton –  Pennsylvania
John Sevier –  Tennessee
John Gill Shorter –  Alabama
Al Smith –  New York
Samuel E. Smith – Maine
William Spry –  Utah
Leland Stanford –  California
Onslow Stearns –  New Hampshire
Charles C. Stratton –  New Jersey
Ezekiel A. Straw –  New Hampshire
Bob Taft –  Ohio
Edward Tiffin –  Ohio
Samuel J. Tilden –  New York
Benjamin Tillman –  South Carolina
Daniel D. Tompkins –  New York
John Treadwell –  Connecticut
William Trousdale –  Tennessee
James Hoge Tyler –  Virginia
John Tyler Sr. –  Virginia
Robert S. Vessey –  South Dakota
Joseph Marshall Walker –  Louisiana
Cadwallader C. Washburn –  Wisconsin
William Weld –  Massachusetts
Heber Manning Wells –  Utah
John Wereat –  Georgia
George P. Wetmore –  Rhode Island
Frank White –  North Dakota
James Withycombe –  Oregon
Oliver Wolcott –  Connecticut
Oliver Wolcott Jr. –  Connecticut
Urban A. Woodbury –  Vermont
Fielding L. Wright –  Mississippi

Historical figures
Susan B. Anthony –  activist for women's rights
Clara Barton –  pioneer teacher, nurse, and humanitarian
Daniel Boone –  American pioneer and hunter whose frontier exploits made him one of the first folk heroes of the US
John Brown –  abolitionist
Mary Katherine Campbell (1905–1990) Miss America titleholder 1922 and 1923; first runner-Up 1924
Amelia Earhart –  aviation pioneer and author
Wyatt Earp – westerner: Gunfight at the O.K. Corral
Samuel Fielden – socialist, anarchist, labor organizer
Elizabeth Fones – Puritan settler
Pat Garrett –  best known for killing Billy the Kid
Howard Hughes –  aviator, industrialist, film producer and director, philanthropist, and one of the wealthiest people in the world
Francis Scott Key –  amateur poet who wrote the words to the United States' national anthem, "The Star-Spangled Banner"
Charles Lindbergh –  aviator, author, inventor and explorer
Rebecca Nurse –  figure in the Salem witch trials
Annie Oakley – sharpshooter
John Proctor – English born victim of the Salem Witch Trials
Rick Rescorla – a hero of September 11, 2001
Betsy Ross – maker of the first American flag
Elizabeth Short – murder victim who was nicknamed the "Black Dahlia"
Joseph Smith  – religious leader and founder of Mormonism
Paul Tibbets –  brigadier general in the United States Air Force; known for being the pilot of the Enola Gay, the first aircraft to drop an atomic bomb in the history of warfare
J. D. Tippit – police officer killed by Lee Harvey Oswald
Abigail Williams – accuser in the Salem witch trials

Mormon pioneers

May Anderson
Ebenezer Beesley
William Bickerton
Thomas Bullock
George Careless
William Clayton
Joseph Fielding
Ruth May Fox
Emma Lee French
George Goddard
May Green Hinckley
Henry Howell
John Jaques
Heber C. Kimball
Charles Kingston
Christopher Layton
George Manwaring
Abraham Marchant
Peter Maughan
L. John Nuttall
Ralph Partington
Charles W. Penrose
George Reynolds
Brigham Henry Roberts
Charles Roscoe Savage
Joseph F. Smith
Mary Fielding Smith
Edward Stevenson
James E. Talmage
Agnes Taylor
John Taylor
George Teasdale
Edward Tullidge
David King Udall
Nellie Unthank
George D. Watt
Daniel H. Wells
John Wells
Emily H. Woodmansee

Inventors
Charles Alderton
Samuel Andrews
Earl W. Bascom (1906-1995) – early inventor of rodeo equipment
John Bidwell
Gail Borden
Caleb Bradham
Vannevar Bush – founder of Raytheon
Franklin S. Cooper
Peter Cooper Hewitt
Samuel Colt
William Crompton
Moncena Dunn
George Eastman
Thomas Edison
Isaac L. Ellwood
Thaddeus Fairbanks
Philo Farnsworth
Calvin Souther Fuller
King Camp Gillette
Charles Goodyear
William S. Harley
Robert Hoe
Christopher Jones
Samuel Pierpont Langley
Daniel Leavitt
Thomas Leavitt
Samuel Morse
Elon Musk
John Pemberton
Eliphalet Remington 
Edward S. Renwick – father was James Renwick
William Bradford Shockley
Elihu Thomson 
Jimmy Wales
Eli Whitney
Orville and Wilbur Wright
Amos Whitney

Journalists
Ambrose Bierce
Peter Brimelow
Heather Brooke
Tina Brown
Charles Carleton Coffin
Jane Cunningham Croly
Anderson Cooper
Benjamin Edes
Savannah Guthrie
Chris Hedges
Ronald Hilton
David Ignatius
Rachel Maddow
Chris Matthews
Michael Moynihan
Edward R. Murrow
Cokie Roberts
Charlie Rose
Diane Sawyer
Paul W. Smith
Ida M. Tarbell
Barbara Walters

Military
Ethan Allen
Benedict Arnold
Henry H. Arnold
Edward Dickinson Baker
Thomas W. Bradley
Braxton Bragg
John C. Breckinridge
Jacob Brown
John Buford
Matthew Butler
Henry A. Byroade
George Rogers Clark
Wesley Clark – mother of English descent
Norvell P. Cobb
George A. Cobham Jr.
Boston Corbett – Union Army soldier who shot and killed Abraham Lincoln's assassin, John Wilkes Booth
George Armstrong Custer
Abner Doubleday
Thomas D. Doubleday
Donald McNeill Fairfax
Horatio Gates
Edmund P. Gaines
Horatio Gates
Nathanael Greene
William Halsey, Jr
Charles Hamlin
Cyrus Hamlin
Wade Hampton III
Winfield Scott Hancock
Henry Heth
Theophilus H. Holmes
John Bell Hood
Joseph Hooker
Esek Hopkins
Oliver O. Howard
Henry L. Hulbert
Samuel Huntington
Stonewall Jackson
Joseph E. Johnston
Charles Lee
Edwin Gray Lee
Robert E. Lee
Samuel Phillips Lee
James Longstreet
Douglas MacArthur
James Murray Mason
John S. McCain Jr.
John S. McCain Sr.
George B. McClellan
James B. McPherson
Richard Worsam Meade II
Robert Leamy Meade
James F. Merton
Robert Olds
Robin Olds
George S. Patton
Hiram Paulding
Matthew C. Perry
John J. Pershing
Noah Phelps
George Pickett
George W. Randolph
Deborah Sampson
James M. Shackelford
Robert Gould Shaw
Robert F. Stockton
J.E.B. Stuart
Richard Taylor
William B. Travis
Edward Trenchard
Lucian Truscott
Ronald R. Van Stockum
Vernon A. Walters
Abraham Whipple
John Ancrum Winslow

Models
Angela Bowie
Bebe Buell
Cindy Crawford
Jerry Hall – of partial English descent
Crystal Harris – both parents of English descent
Alexandra Richards
Kimberly Stewart
Kate Upton – of partial English descent
Kendra Wilkinson – of part English descent

Political figures
Dean Acheson
Jimmy Carter
John Caven
Walter Chiles
Hillary Clinton
Calvin Coolidge
George P. Bush
George W. Bush
George H. W. Bush
Richard Girnt Butler
Jefferson Davis
Charles E. Dudley
William M. Evarts
Gerald Ford
Benjamin Franklin
Warren G. Harding
Herbert Hoover
William Jennings
Lyndon B. Johnson
Richard Henry Lee
Robert Liddell
George Mason
Malcolm Nichols
Richard Nixon
Barack Obama
Henry Paulson
Ronald Reagan
George Lincoln Rockwell
Mitt Romney
Franklin D. Roosevelt
Edward Shippen
George Sutherland
John Townsend
Harry S. Truman
Donald J. Trump
Martin H. Weight
Caspar Weinberger – former U.S. Secretary of Defense
Harry Weeks – political activist and economist
Woodrow Wilson

American pornographic film actors
Tracey Adams
Eva Angelina
Tori Black
Sasha Grey
Jenna Jameson
Noname Jane
Shayla LaVeaux
Brandi Love
Tera Patrick – of partial English descent
Chanel Preston

Presidents of the United States
A number of the presidents of the United States have English ancestry. The extent of English ancestry varies in the presidents with earlier presidents being predominantly of colonial English Yankee stock. Later U.S. presidents ancestry can often be traced to ancestors from multiple nations in Europe, including England.

George Washington (English)
1st President 1789–97  (great-grandfather, John Washington from Purleigh, Essex, England)
John Adams (English)
2nd President 1797–1801 (great-great-grandfather, Henry Adams, born 1583, Barton St David, Somerset, England, immigrated to Boston, Massachusetts)
Thomas Jefferson (Welsh and Scotch-English)
3rd President 1801–1809 (maternal English ancestry from William Randolph)
James Madison (English)
4th President 1809–17
John Quincy Adams (English)
6th President 1825–29 (Henry Adams born 1583 Barton St David, Somerset, England)
William Harrison (English)
9th President 1841–1841
John Tyler (English)
10th President 1841–1845
Zachary Taylor (English)
12th President 1849–50
Millard Fillmore (English)
13th President 1850–1853
Franklin Pierce (English)
14th President 1853–1857
Abraham Lincoln (English)
16th President 1861–65 (Samuel Lincoln baptised 1622 in Hingham, Norfolk, England, died in Hingham, Massachusetts).
Andrew Johnson (Scotch-Irish and English)
17th President 1865–1869
Ulysses S. Grant (Scotch-Irish, English and Scottish)
18th President 1869–77
Rutherford Hayes (English)
19th President 1877–1881
James A. Garfield (English and French)
20th President 1881–81
Chester A. Arthur (Scotch-Irish and English)
21st President 1881–85
Grover Cleveland (Scotch-Irish and English)
22nd and 24th President 1885–89, 1893–97
Benjamin Harrison (Scotch-Irish and English)
23rd President 1889–93
William McKinley (Scotch-Irish and English)
25th President 1897–1901
Theodore Roosevelt (Scotch-Irish, Dutch, Scotch, English and French)
26th President 1901–1909
William Taft (Scotch-Irish and English)
27th President 1909–1913
Woodrow Wilson (Scotch-Irish and English)
28th President 1913–1921 (Wilson's mother Janet was born in Carlisle)
Warren G. Harding (Scotch-Irish and English)
29th President 1921–23
Calvin Coolidge (English)
30th President 1923–1929
Franklin D. Roosevelt (Dutch, French and English)
32nd President 1933–45
Harry S Truman (Scotch-Irish, English and German)
33rd President 1945–53 (English and Irish descent)
Lyndon B. Johnson (English)
36th President 1963–69
Richard Nixon (Scotch-Irish, Irish, English and German)
37th President 1969–74 (English and Irish descent)
Gerald Ford (English)
38th President 1974–77
Jimmy Carter (Scotch-Irish and English)
39th President 1977–81 (Thomas Carter Sr. emigrated from England to Isle of Wight County, Virginia)
Ronald Reagan (Scotch-Irish, Irish, English & Scottish)
40th President 1981–1989
George H. W. Bush (Scotch-Irish and English)
41st President 1989–93
Bill Clinton (Scotch-Irish and English)
42nd President 1993–2001
George W. Bush (Scotch-Irish and English)
43rd President 2001–2009 (Reynold Bush from Messing, Essex, England emigrated in 1631 to Cambridge, Massachusetts)
Barack Obama (Luo, English and Irish)
44th President 2009–2017 (his mother Ann Dunham's heritage is mostly English and Irish)
Donald J Trump (Scottish)
45th President 2017-2021
Joe Biden (Irish, French, and English)
46th President 2021-present (William Biden from Sussex, England emigrated before 1822 to Baltimore, Maryland)

Vice presidents of the United States
John Adams
Thomas Jefferson
Aaron Burr
Elbridge Gerry
Daniel D. Tompkins
John Tyler
Millard Fillmore
John C. Breckinridge
Hannibal Hamlin
William Wheeler
Levi P. Morton
Theodore Roosevelt
James S. Sherman
Calvin Coolidge
Charles G. Dawes
Charles Curtis
John Nance Garner
Henry A. Wallace
Alben W. Barkley
Richard Nixon
Lyndon B. Johnson
Gerald Ford
Nelson Rockefeller
George H. W. Bush
Dan Quayle
Al Gore
Dick Cheney
Joe Biden

Religious figures
Costen Jordan Harrell
Anne Hutchinson
Eben Samuel Johnson
Joseph R. N. Maxwell
St. John O'Sullivan
Charles W. Penrose
Anna Howard Shaw
George Teasdale
Edward Thomson
Ellen G. White
John R. Winder

Members of the United States House of Representatives
Philip P. Barbour –  Virginia
Arthur Laban Bates –  Pennsylvania
Brian Baird –  Washington
William Bingham –  Pennsylvania
Clifton R. Breckinridge –  Arkansas
James Frankland Briggs –  New Hampshire
Thomas Patterson Brockman –  South Carolina
William Jennings Bryan –  Nebraska
Charles Frederick Crisp –  Georgia
Davy Crockett –  Tennessee
Franklin Davenport –  New Jersey
George Dent –  Maryland
Samuel Dibble –  South Carolins
Stephen A. Douglas –  Illinois
Newt Gingrich –  Georgia
Ernest Greenwood –  New York
Steny Hoyer –  Maryland
Robert Hurt –  Virginia
Martin B. Madden –  Illinois
George A. Marden –  Massachusetts
James Murray Mason –  Virginia
William Milnes Jr. –  Virginia
James H. Osmer –  Pennsylvania
John Randolph –  Virginia
Caesar A. Rodney –  Delaware
Paul Ryan –  Wisconsin
Theodore Sedgwick –  Massachusetts
Charles Slade –  Illinois
William Henry Sowden –  Pennsylvania
Moses T. Stevens –  Massachusetts
Richard Stockton (U.S. senator) – New Jersey
Norton Strange Townshend –  Ohio
David Gardiner Tyler –  Virginia
William D. Washburn –  Minnesota
Robert Charles Winthrop –  Massachusetts
Thomas Contee Worthington –  Maryland

Scientists, researchers
Elizabeth Blackburn
Percy Bridgman – Nobel Prize in Physics
Arthur H. Compton father of English descent
Robert Dewar – computer scientist
Freeman Dyson – theoretical physicist and mathematician
F. Duncan M. Haldane
Oliver Hart (economist)
George H. Hitchings
G. Evelyn Hutchinson
Woods Hutchinson
Henry Way Kendall –  Nobel Prize in Physics
Willis Lamb – Nobel Prize in Physics
Francis Ernest Lloyd
Charles Horace Mayo – medical doctor and chemist, one of seven founder of Mayo Clinic
William James Mayo – medical doctor and chemist, one of seven founder of Mayo Clinic
William Worrall Mayo – medical doctor and chemist, one of seven founder of the Mayo Clinic
George Minot Nobel Prize in Physiology and Medicine
Joseph Priestley – chemist
James Renwick (physicist)
J. Alan Robinson – philosopher, mathematician and computer scientist
Roger Sanders
Albert Schatz (scientist)
Oliver Smithies
James Dewey Watson – molecular biologist
Thomas Bramwell Welch – discoverer of the pasteurization process to prevent the fermentation of grape juice
Robert Burns Woodward –  organic chemist, Nobel Prize in Chemistry

Senators
Nelson W. Aldrich, Rhode Island
Samuel G. Arnold, Rhode Island
Augustus Octavius Bacon, Georgia
Edward Dickinson Baker, Oregon
William T. Barry, Kentucky
Max Baucus, Montana
Michael Bennet, Colorado
Bob Bennett, Utah
Wallace F. Bennett, Utah
Thomas H. Benton, Missouri
William Blount, Tennessee
Lemuel J. Bowden, Virginia
Stephen R. Bradley, Vermont
John Breckinridge, Kentucky
Orville Hickman Browning, Illinois
Frank O. Briggs, New Jersey
Joseph R. Burton, Kansas
Prescott Bush, Connecticut
Andrew Butler, South Carolina
Matthew Butler, South Carolina
Harry F. Byrd Jr., Virginia
Howard Cannon, Nevada
Dudley Chase, Vermont
Rufus Choate, Massachusetts
John M. Clayton, Delaware
Thomas Clayton, Delaware
Dan Coats, Indiana
William Cocke, Tennessee
Walter T. Colquitt, Georgia
Marcus A. Coolidge, Massachusetts
Chris Coons, Delaware
James Cooper, Pennsylvania
Henry W. Corbett, Oregon
Charles Curtis, Kansas
David Daggett, Connecticut
Chauncey Depew, New York
Bob Dole, Kansas
Charles E. Dudley, New York
John Edwards, North Carolina
Mike Enzi, Wyoming
John Wayles Eppes, Virginia
William Few, Georgia
Richard Stockton Field, New Jersey
James Fisk, Vermont
George G. Fogg, New Hampshire
Peter G. Gerry, Rhode Island
Nicholas Gilman, New Hampshire
Barry Goldwater, Arizona
Ray Greene, Rhode Island
Mark Hanna, Ohio
Alexander C. Hanson, Maryland
Orrin Hatch, Utah
Benjamin Hawkins, North Carolina
Carl Hayden, Arizona
Jesse Helms, North Carolina
Nathaniel P. Hill, Colorado
James Hillhouse, Connecticut
Irving Ives, New York
Ralph Izard, South Carolina
John W. Johnston, Virginia
John P. Jones, Nevada
Hamilton Fish Kean, New Jersey
John Kerry, Massachusetts
William H. King, Utah
Paul G. Kirk, Massachusetts
John Laurance, New York
Luke Lea, Tennessee
Blair Lee I, Maryland
Mike Lee, Utah
John McCain, Arizona
Lee Mantle, Montana
Armistead Mason, Virginia
Stevens T. Mason, Virginia
Roger Q. Mills, Texas
Robert Morris, Pennsylvania
Bill Nelson, Florida
Robert C. Nicholas, Louisiana
William North, New York
William A. Palmer, Vermont
Thomas W. Palmer, Michigan
Nahum Parker, New Hampshire
Frank C. Partridge, Vermont
Samuel Pasco, Florida
George H. Pendleton, Ohio
Lawrence C. Phipps, Colorado
Rob Portman, Ohio
Jennings Randolph, West Virginia
Harry Reid, Nevada
Terry Sanford North Carolina
Jeff Sessions, Alabama
John Smith, New York
Samuel M. Shortridge, California
Margaret Chase Smith, Maine
Reed Smoot, Utah
John P. Stockton, New Jersey
John E. Sununu, New Hampshire
Kingsley A. Taft, Ohio
Robert A. Taft, Ohio
Robert Taft Jr., Ohio
James Taliaferro, Florida
Littleton Waller Tazewell, Virginia
Robert Toombs, Georgia
Mark Udall, Colorado
Tom Udall, New Mexico
Malcolm Wallop, Wyoming
Elizabeth Warren, Massachusetts
Daniel Webster, Massachusetts
Edward Douglass White, Louisiana
David Wilmot, Pennsylvania

Sports

Andre Agassi
Muhammad Ali
Kurt Angle
Lance Armstrong
Brent Barry
Jon Barry
Rick Barry
Earl W. Bascom (1906-1995) – rodeo champion, "Father of Modern Rodeo"
James Blake
Aaron Boone
Bob Boone
Bret Boone
Ray Boone
Michael Bradley
Dave Brain
George Brown
Tom Brown – baseball player
Gina Carano
Walter Carlisle
Roy Castleton
John Cena
Paul Child
Geoff Coombes
Harry Cooper
Kenny Cooper – soccer player, currently plays for FC Dallas of Major League Soccer
Matthew Dallman
Lindsay Davenport
Ted DiBiase
 Laurence Ekperigin (born 1988) – basketball player in the Israeli National League
Jacoby Ellsbury
Gary Etherington
Steve Furness
Alan Green
Dick Hall –  soccer player
Alan Hamlyn
Jeff Hardy
Matt Hardy
Tony Hawk
Dan Henderson
Adam Henley
Dick Higham
Phil Hill
Mick Hoban
John Hopkins – motorcycle racer
Mark Howe
Marty Howe
Bernie James
Derek Jeter
 Sacha Killeya-Jones (born 1998) - basketball player 
 Danny Lewis (born 1970) – basketball player
Ryan Lochte
Barry Mahy
Alan Merrick
Ken Miles
George Moorhouse
Heath Pearce
Chad Pennington
Michael Phelps
 Tarik Phillip 
Billy Pierce
Ted Potter Jr.
Kenny Roberts
Mal Roche
Chris Rodd
Andy Roddick
Elwood Romney
Adam Rosen – British-American luge Olympian
Ronda Rousey
Arthur Rudd
Tim Tebow 
Brendan Schaub
Tim Shaw
Denny Shute 
May Sutton
Adam Vinatieri
Lindsey Vonn
Brad Walker
Cyril Walker
Tim Ward – soccer
Jarrod Washburn
Katarina Waters - professional wrestler
 Josh West (born 1977) – British-American Olympic rower and earth sciences professor
Lew Worsham, golfer
Harry Wright
 Cameron Carter-Vickers
Chris Wyles
 Duane Holmes
 Seb Hines

United States Supreme Court justices
Oliver Ellsworth
Oliver Wendell Holmes Jr.
John Marshall 
Sandra Day O'Connor
William Rehnquist
George Sutherland
Byron White
Levi Woodbury
William Burnham Woods

Other
 Alton Brown – celebrity chef and creator/host of Food Network's Good Eats
 Patricia Buckley – socialite
 Ann Dunham – anthropologist and mother of President Barack Obama
 Darci Lynne – singer and ventriloquist
 Wally George – radio host and television commentator
 Daisy and Violet Hilton – co-joined twins
 Nelle Wilson Reagan – mother of President Ronald Reagan
 Frank H.T. Rhodes – university president, government science advisor
 Henry Chadwick – known as the father of baseball
 Richard B. Spencer – Public speaker and activist on behalf of the alt-right movement
 Jerry Springer – TV presenter

References

External links

Lists of American people by ethnic or national origin
Americans